Michalice  (German Michelsdorf) is a village in the administrative district of Gmina Namysłów, within Namysłów County, Opole Voivodeship, in south-western Poland. 

References

Michalice